IROC IX was the ninth year of IROC competition, which took place in 1985. It saw the use of the Chevrolet Camaro in all races, was the second straight season that television coverage was on CBS, and continued the format introduced in IROC VIII. Race one took place on the Daytona International Speedway, race two took place at Mid-Ohio, race three was rained out at Talladega Superspeedway, and race four concluded the year at Michigan International Speedway. Harry Gant won the championship and $158,200 in a tie-breaker with Darrell Waltrip.

The roster of drivers and final points standings were as follows:

Race results

Race One, Daytona International Speedway
Friday, February 15, 1985

(5) Indicates 5 bonus points added to normal race points scored for leading the most laps.(3) Indicates 3 bonus points added to normal race points scored for leading the 2nd most laps(2) Indicates 2 bonus points added to normal race points scored for leading the 3rd most laps.

Average speed: Cautions: 1 (Lap 15, Tom Gloy accident in the tri-oval.)Margin of victory: 3 secLead changes: 3

Race Two, Mid-Ohio Sports Car Course
Friday, June 8, 1985

(5) Indicates 5 bonus points added to normal race points scored for leading the most laps.(3) Indicates 3 bonus points added to normal race points scored for leading the 2nd most laps(2) Indicates 2 bonus points added to normal race points scored for leading the 3rd most laps (Did not occur in this race so not awarded).

Average speed: Cautions: noneMargin of victory: 2.4 secLead changes: 1

Race Three, Talladega Superspeedway

This race was scheduled for Saturday July 27th, 1985 but was canceled due to rain

Race Four, Michigan International Speedway
Saturday, August 10, 1985

(5) Indicates 5 bonus points added to normal race points scored for leading the most laps.(3) Indicates 3 bonus points added to normal race points scored for leading the 2nd most laps(2) Indicates 2 bonus points added to normal race points scored for leading the 3rd most laps.

Average speed: Cautions: noneMargin of victory: 4 feetLead changes: 8

Notes
 Harry Gant and Darrell Waltrip tied for the championship, but Gant was awarded the title due to a higher finishing position in the final race.
 Terry Labonte and Derek Bell tied for fifth place, but Labonte was awarded the position due a higher finish in the final race.
 Mario Andretti did not compete in the final race due to injury.

References

External links
IROC IX History - IROC Website

International Race of Champions
1985 in American motorsport